Mineralovodsky District is an administrative district (raion), one of the twenty-six in Stavropol Krai, Russia. It is located in the south of the krai. Its administrative center is the town of Mineralnye Vody (which is not administratively a part of the district). Population:  46,626 (2002 Census); 38,669 (1989 Census).

Administrative and municipal status
Within the framework of administrative divisions, Mineralovodsky District is one of the twenty-six in the krai. The town of Mineralnye Vody serves as its administrative center, despite being incorporated separately as a town of krai significance—an administrative unit with the status equal to that of the districts.

As a municipal division, the territory of the district and the territory of the town of krai significance of Mineralnye Vody have been incorporated together as Mineralovodsky Urban Okrug since June 7, 2015. Prior to that, the district was incorporated as Mineralovodsky Municipal District and the town of krai significance of Mineralnye Vody was incorporated within it as Mineralnye Vody Urban Settlement.

References

Notes

Sources

Districts of Stavropol Krai
